John Hanbury may refer to:

 John Hanbury (1664–1734), English industrialist, patented the tinplate rolling process
 John Hanbury (1744–1784), Welsh industrialist and grandson of John Hanbury (1664–1734)
 John Hanbury (hurler) (born 1993), hurler for Galway
 John Hanbury (MP) (1574–1658), English politician

See also
 John Hanbury-Williams (1859–1946), Major-General